Bangarada Hoovu is a 1967 Indian Kannada language film directed, written and produced by B. A. Arasu Kumar. The film stars Rajkumar, Kalpana, Udaykumar and Shylashri. The film won many laurels upon release including the National Film Award for Best Feature Film in Kannada. The movie was an adaptation of the play Abhaagini written by the director himself. The movie speaks about the misconceptions regarding leprosy - especially against the superstition that leprosy is a consequence of one's past sins.

Plot
Anand and Latha grow up together. Latha falls in love with Anand. After his education, Anand goes to Rampura as a Block Development Officer where he falls in love with his friend's sister Seetha. However, Seetha suddenly refuses to marry Anand as she is suffering from leprosy. Disappointed, Anand returns to his village. His mother presses him to marry Latha, telling him that leprosy is an incurable disease. However, Seetha is cured and on her return, she finds that Anand is about to marry Latha. In desperation, she tries to commit suicide, but Anand and her (Seetha's) relatives come to know of it. Anand rushes to her rescue and they are united.

Cast
 Rajkumar as Anand
 Kalpana as Seetha
 Udaykumar as Ravi
 Shylashri as Latha
 Balakrishna as Padmanabha Panditha
 Narasimharaju
 Pandari Bai as Anand's Mother
 Dinesh as Doctor (small appearance)
 Rajeshwari

Soundtrack
The music was composed by Rajan–Nagendra, with lyrics by Chi. Udaya Shankar and Vijaya Narasimha.

Awards
 National Film Award for Best Feature Film in Kannada
 Karnataka State Film Award for Best Film
 Karnataka State Film Award for Best Actor - Rajkumar

References

External links
 

1967 films
1960s Kannada-language films
Indian black-and-white films
Films scored by Rajan–Nagendra
Best Kannada Feature Film National Film Award winners